Roger William Wright CBE (born 15 August 1956, in Manchester) is an English arts administrator. He is currently the Chief Executive of Britten Pears Arts.

Wright was educated at Chetham's School of Music, Manchester, and played the cello as a youth.  He studied music at Royal Holloway College, University of London, and earned a B.Mus. in 1977.  On graduation, he took a sabbatical year, 1977–78, as the elected President of the Student Union.

From 1978 to 1986, Wright worked at the British Music Information Centre (BMIC), as librarian and manager, then as director. He served as a senior producer for the BBC Symphony Orchestra from 1986 to 1989.  He became the artistic administrator of The Cleveland Orchestra in 1989.  He left his Cleveland post in 1992 for Deutsche Grammophon (DG), where he became an executive director and vice-president, and worked there until 1997.

In March 1997, Wright took up the newly created BBC post of Head of Classical Music, in charge of the BBC's orchestras, choirs, and bands. In 1998, he became Controller of Radio 3.  During his Radio 3 tenure he raised the profile of jazz and world music, causing controversy among listeners. Other Radio 3 programming changes such as a perceived diminution of live music broadcasts also attracted controversy, in addition to a perceived dilution of the level of programming. Wright was named Director of the BBC Proms in April 2007 and formally took up the post in October 2007, succeeding Nicholas Kenyon.  In March 2014, he announced his resignation from the BBC to become chief executive at Aldeburgh Music, effective September 2014. When Wright formally stood down as Controller of Radio 3 and of The Proms in July 2014, he was the longest serving controller of the station.  Following Aldeburgh Music's merger with Snape Maltings in 2015, and Snape Maltings' merger with the Britten-Pears Foundation in 2020, he is currently Chief Executive of Britten Pears Arts, which runs Snape Maltings, The Red House, Aldeburgh, and the Aldeburgh Festival.

In 2002, Wright was awarded an Honorary Fellowship of Royal Holloway College.  He is also an Honorary Fellow of the Royal College of Music and a Fellow of the Radio Academy.  His publications include the volume New Music 1989, in collaboration with Michael Finnissy.

He was appointed Commander of the Order of the British Empire (CBE) in the 2015 New Year Honours for services to music.

Wright and his wife Rosie, a yoga teacher, have two children, Alice and William.

References

External links
 BBC press biography of Roger Wright
 Ian Lace, "The Roger Wright interview", MusicWeb International, March 2007
 "The Necessity of Re-invention", Speech given by Roger Wright at the Musicians' Benevolent Fund annual luncheon, London, 21 November 2001
 "Awards and Achievements", Royal Holloway College, December 2001
 Archived news ("HRH The Prince of Wales visits RCM"), Royal College of Music (web page undated)
 Fellows, Radio Academy

BBC music executives
People associated with the BBC Proms
BBC Radio 3 controllers
Living people
1956 births
Musicians from Manchester
Alumni of Royal Holloway, University of London
Commanders of the Order of the British Empire